Beto y sus Canarios are a Regional Mexican band formed in Huetamo, Michoacán, Mexico. It was founded in 1987 by Gabino García and Edilberto Portillo. After releasing several albums, in 2001 the group released their album Tuve una novia, featuring the single Noche eterna, which became a number-one hit in the Billboard Hot Latin Songs chart.

The Huetamo-raised group in company with their compatriots, La Dinastía de Tuzantla are two pioneers in exploiting Tierra Caliente music.

History
The versatile Calentano group Beto y Sus Canarios was formed in 1987 in Huetamo, Michoacán, Mexico, in the Tierra Caliente region (Spanish for Hot Land). The musical director Gabino García approached Edilberto Portillo with the proposal at the beginning of that year and the two went to work to audition and recruit members, establishing themselves as musicians who had not been in any kind of musical group before theirs.  

It took the ensemble seven months of rehearsal and organization before they began playing for community events and social gatherings. Early recordings generated local hits that became regional hits. Songs like "Mi Ultimo Contrabanda" and "Carga Fina" caught the ear of audiences outside of Mexico, and the group was soon offered opportunities to travel and perform throughout the United States.

Beto y sus Canarios has two songs in Billboard's Top 20 Regional Mexican Songs of All Time, with Está Llorando Mi Corazón and No Puedo Olvidarte. Ranking #15 and #7 respectively.

Epigmenio Gaytán, who was the keyboardist in for the group, passed away due to the COVID-19 pandemic in Mexico.

Members 
 Andrique García Morales, Voice
 Humberto Santibañez Pineda, Voice
 Zirahuén Gaspar, Voice
 Sotero Garcia Flores, Drums
 Pedro Pineda Díaz, Accordion
 Jose Alberto Cortez, Bass guitar
 Eduardo Lucas Cervantes, Alto saxophone
 Alexis Cortéz, Trumpet
 Andrés Abarca, Trumpet
 Trinidad Villaseñor Cortéz, Guitar
 Juan Fernando Ochoa Gonzalez, "Trumpet"
 Mauricio Arias Pascual, "Bass Guitar"
 Luis Felipe Rojas Estrada, "Keyboard"

Discography

Albums
 1993: Con Cartitas (first album on Discos Ciudad / DLV)  
 1994: Puras de Arranque
 1996: Banda Armada
 1997: Pura Carga Fina
 1998: A Quién Esperas
 1999: Que Dios Te Bendiga
 2001: Tuve Una Novia (last album on Discos Ciudad / DLV) 
 2002: Mi Despedida (first album on Disa) 
 2004: 100% Tierra Caliente
 2005: Ardientes
 2006: Contigo por Siempre
 2007: Gracias
 2009: Loco Por Tu Amor
 2010: De Parranda en Parranda (last album on Disa) 
 2012: Sin Reversa (only album on Vene Music) 
 2014: Por Todo Tierra Caliente (first album on Morena Music) 
 2015: Homenaje al Poeta Gracias Joan Sebastian
 2016: Al Estilo de Mi Rancho
 2019: Al Fin Te Encontré a Ti
 2021  Especial 34 Aniversario
 2021  Amores Aventureros

Singles
 2004: "Está Llorando Mi Corazón"
 2005: "No Puedo Olvidarte"

Awards

References

External links
Youtube
Facebook
Instagram
Twitter
Spotify

Musical groups from Michoacán
Tierra Caliente music groups